Dedications is an hour-long television program aired on Canadian music TV station MuchMusic. It compiled viewers' music-video requests that are dedicated in the name of viewer's friends and families. The requests were sent to MuchMusic headquarters via cellphone text message, email, and phone.

Much (TV channel) original programming